Handbal Club Buzău, commonly known as HC Buzău, is a men's handball team from Buzău, Romania. The club was founded in 2012 and promoted for the first time in its history in the Liga Națională at the end of the 2017–18 Divizia A season.

The club is nicknamed as The Buzău Wolves and plays its home matches in Sala Sporturilor "Romeo Iamandi" from Buzău, a sports hall with a capacity of 1,868 people.

Kits

Honours
Divizia A:
Runners-up  (1): 2018

Players 2022–23

Current squad

Goalkeeper
 1  Bogdan Manole
 12  Eugen Crăciunescu
 16  Cristian Tcaciuc
Wingers
 2  Vlad Păncescu
 4  Denis Rizea
 7  Ionuț Broască
 15  Liviu Mironescu
 20  Andrei Bejinariu
 77  Sergio Barros
 99  Ionuț Mirică
Line player
 6  Zamfir Dumitrana
 8  Cristian Petruț
 18   Bogdan Meduric
 27  Alexandru Popa
 43  Bogdan Păunescu

Back players
 5  Shahoo Nosrati
 10  Abdoulah Mané
 11  Viacheslav Sadovyi
 13  Petru Stroe
 14  George Scarlat
 17  Lukas Juskenas
 21  Aleksandar Glendža
 22  Eduard Iordachi
 32  Luka Mitrovic
 97  Mihai Anton

References

External links
 

 
Romanian handball clubs
Sport in Buzău
Handball clubs established in 2012
2012 establishments in Romania
Liga Națională (men's handball)
Divizia A (men's handball)